Mary Woods may refer to:
 Mary Lee Woods, English mathematician and computer scientist
 Mary Tenison Woods, South Australian lawyer and social activist

See also
 Mary Wood (disambiguation)